Maury Harlan McMains (February 2, 1903 – August 10, 1993) was an American football and basketball coach. He served as the head football coach at Drexel University from 1944 to 1945 and for the final three games of the 1948 season, compiling a record of 4–10.  McMains was the head basketball coach of Drexel's ASTU team (a mixed team of civilians and cadets) during the 1943–44 season, tallying a mark of 3–2.  McMains was also the director of the physical training program for the cadets.  When McMains was unavailable, Gene Carney (A-3) assumed coaching responsibilities as a player-coach.  The following season, McMains was named the head coach of the varsity basketball team, which finished the season with a record of 2–11.  He also coached baseball, lacrosse, and golf at Drexel.

Head coaching record

Football

Basketball

Notes

References

1903 births
1993 deaths
American football quarterbacks
Basketball coaches from Iowa
College golf coaches in the United States
Drexel Dragons athletic directors
Drexel Dragons baseball coaches
Drexel Dragons football coaches
Drexel Dragons men's basketball coaches
Drexel Dragons men's lacrosse coaches
McDaniel Green Terror football players
Quantico Marines Devil Dogs football players
Players of American football from Des Moines, Iowa
Sportspeople from Des Moines, Iowa